Udvada railway station is a railway station on the Western Railway in the state of Gujarat, India. Udvada railway station is 17 km far away from Valsad railway station. Passenger, MEMU and few Express trains halt at Udvada railway station.

In 2019, a new heritage look will be given to 123 years old Udvada railway station. Structure of new building will resemble Parsi religion's carved house type structure.

References

See also
 Valsad district

Railway stations in Valsad district
Mumbai WR railway division